The Reno Street Circuit was an auto racing street circuit located in Reno, Nevada, set up in the parking lot of the Reno Hilton hotel and casino. It played host to a single Trans-Am Series event in 1997.

References

Motorsport venues in Nevada
Defunct motorsport venues in the United States
Defunct sports venues in Nevada
Sports venues completed in 1997